North Middleton may refer to:

North Middleton, Greater Manchester, a ward of Rochdale Borough Council, England
North Middleton, Midlothian, Scotland
North Middleton, Ilderton, a location in Northumberland, England
North Middleton, Wallington Demesne, a former civil parish, now in Wallington Demesne, Northumberland, England
North Middleton Township, Pennsylvania, United States

See also
 Middleton (disambiguation)
 South Middleton (disambiguation)
 West Middleton